Abril Schreiber (born February 12, 1987) is a Venezuelan actress. Born in Caracas, Venezuela. She made herself known on Venezuelan television in telenovelas such as Amor a palos, Toda una dama, and Tomasa Tequiero. She lives in Bogota, Colombia, where she has been known for several productions.

Filmography

Film

Television

References

External links 
 

1987 births
Living people
Actresses from Caracas
Venezuelan telenovela actresses